Mount Shadow is a small peak in the Admiralty Mountains that rises above and close west of Shadow Bluff at the junction of the Tucker and Leander Glaciers. Climbed by the geological team of the New Zealand Geological Survey Antarctic Expedition (NZGSAE), 1957–58, in January 1958, and named from association with Shadow Bluff and nearby Mount Midnight.

Admiralty Mountains
Mountains of Victoria Land
Borchgrevink Coast